Hole is a municipality in Viken county, Norway. It is part of the traditional region of Ringerike. The administrative centre of the municipality is the village of Vik. Hole is located around lake Tyrifjorden and extends to the woodland around Oslo. The soil is fertile and suited to growing fruit, berries and other agricultural products.

The municipality of Hole was established on 1 January 1838 (see formannskapsdistrikt). The annex of Tyristrand was separated from Hole on 1 July 1916 to become a municipality of its own. The municipality of Hole was merged into the neighboring municipality of Ringerike in 1964, however, this merger ended in 1977 when Hole was restored as a separate municipality.

Infrastructure: the road (E16) between Sandvika and Hønefoss has been Norway's most deadly, for the ten-year period that ended in 2021; nine people died.

Name
The municipality (originally the parish) is named after the old Hole farm (Old Norse: Hólar), since the first church was built there. The name is the plural form of hóll which means "round (and isolated) hill".

Coat-of-arms
The coat-of-arms is from modern times, as they were granted on 24 May 1985. The arms show four gold crowns on a red background. They are a symbol for the four Norwegian Kings who lived in the municipality in the 9th-11th centuries:

Halfdan the Black lived during the 9th century married Ragnhild, the daughter of Sigurd Hart.  Berserkers killed Sigurd Hart and subsequently kidnapped his daughter Ragnhild.  Halfdan the Black saved Ragnhild and married her.  King Halfdan the Black ended his life in 860 by going through the ice on Randsfjorden with his men, his horse, and sledge.  His body-or some part thereof-was possibly buried at the Stein farm on Halvdanshaugen ("The Mound of Halvdan").
Sigurd Syr lived during the 11th century.  He was the great-great grandchild of Harald Hårfagre (900-940).  Although a king, Sigurd Syr was mainly interested in agricultural matters, which was quite exceptional for a king at that time.  His nickname Syr meant:  "The one who is digging in the field".  He was known as a peaceful and very wise man.  Sigurd Syr married the widow Åsta Gudbrandsdatter, who had a little son, Olav, today known as St. Olaf.  Åsta and Sigurd Syr were the parents of Harald Hårdråde.
St. Olav (or Olav Haraldsson) reigned from 1015 to 1030.  His mother was the above-mentioned Åsta and his stepfather was King Sigurd Syr.  However, Olaf Haraldsson's real father was Harald Grenske, who had been killed in 995.  His widow, Åsta, gave birth to Olaf at the same year, but we do not know for sure if Olaf was born at Harald Grenske's place in Vestfold or in Hole.  Olaf Haraldsson is one out of four saints in Norwegian history and world known.
Harald Hårdråde reigned from 1046 to 1066 and was the half brother of Olaf Haraldsson.  He was born at King Syr's farm.  As a king he was known for his tough rule.  He was only 15 years old when he fought in the battle of Stiklestad in 1030 and experienced the death of his half brother.

History
Hole has an extensive and important role in Norwegian history.  Archeological finds from the Roman and Migration periods are numerous. Hole is also known as one of the traditional landscapes from the Viking Age and plays a prominent role in the Norse sagas.

King Halfdan the Black of Vestfold conquered the Ringerike traditional district, including Hole, in about 830 AD. According to saga, when he died he was so popular that every district wanted his body. As a result, his body was quartered; his head was buried in the mound at the Stein estate in Hole. Halfdan the Black's second wife, Ragnild from Hole, was the mother of the first king of Norway, Harald I of Norway (also known as Harald Fairhair).

Saint Olaf (king of Norway from 1015 to 1028) was born in Hole, near where the 12th century Bønsnes Church (Bønsnes kirke) is located, to Harold Grenske (a grandson of Harald I of Norway) and his wife Asta. Asta later remarried to Sigurd Syr, chieftain of Hole, and had a son born there named Harold, (Harald Hårdråde) who later became Harald III Sigurdsson (king of Norway from 1046 to 1066) .

Ringerkike's famous poet, Jørgen Moe, was brought up on the Mo (or Moe) farm in Hole. Many of the fairy tales gathered by Asbjørnsen and Moe were collected in this area. Frognøya and Størøya are also important historical places in Hole.

On July 22, 2011, the Workers' Youth League summer camp, which took place on Utøya in Hole, was attacked as part of the 2011 Norway attacks.

Geography

The municipality of Hole is bordered on the north by Ringerike municipality, in the east by Bærum municipality and in the south by Lier municipality. South of the lake Tyrifjorden it also borders on Modum municipality.  Most of the residents live in the villages of Sundvollen, Vik, Kroksund, Helgelandsmoen, Steinsåsen, Røyse, and Sollihøgda.

From the viewpoint "Kongens utsikt"  which lies on Krokskogen, there are views of the landscape of Hole.  The main road between Oslo and Bergen, European route E16, runs through the community.

Government
The current mayor is Per Ragnvald Berger (born 18 October 1952), representing Høyre, the Conservatives, reelected for 2011–2015. Berger is in for his fourth term and was first elected in 1999.

Stein Church Ruins

Stein Church  Ruins (Stein kirkeruin) are located at Steinsfjorden. Originally constructed in the latter half of the 1100s, it was built of sandstone and limestone from the area. The chapel had a rectangular nave and narrower, very short choir area. The sanctuary  had portals in the west and south. By the second half of the 1500s, the chapel was no longer in use. In the 1570s, the inventory had been transferred Hamar Cathedral.

Bønsnes Church
Bønsnes church (Bønsnes Kirke) is a small medieval era church. It is built of brick and was built in 1100. The church has rectangular plan and 80 seats. The church has conservation status protected. Bønsnes church has a later added wooden tower in front of the west gable. The tower is probably built in connection with repairs to the roof and masonry in the 1850s. In 1500s and 1600s the  church decayed. It was only after it was enabled in 1728, it was brought back into use.

In 1790 the interior was given a new decor. Painted clouds are on the ceiling, the pulpit and the gallery. The altarpiece is probably from the 1700s, featuring the Crucifixion and the Last Supper, surrounded by leaf ornaments, columns and sculptures. The medieval interior has a  Madonna sculpture from the 1200s and a crucifix from the 1400s.

Hole Church

Hole Church  (Hole kirke) probably stems from approximately 1200. It  is located in a hilly landscape around 5 km southwest of Norderhov Church on a peninsula in Tyrifjord. The edifice is of stone and has 350 seats. The altarpiece in the Rococo style.
It was largely destroyed by fire in 1736. The church was rebuilt in 1737.  Repairs, restorations and remodeling occurred during 1827 and  1909. The old church  burned to the ground after  a lightning strike in 1943. The restored church is built by sandstone from the district and consists of a long, rectangular nave and a narrower, almost square choir in the east.

Notable residents

 Frederik Wilhelm Stabell (1763–1836) a military officer and politician
 Christopher Simonsen Fougner (1795–1869) a politician, Mayor of Hole from 1840 to 1848
 Morten Ludvig Sundt (1809–1891) a farmer and politician, Mayor of Hole from 1850 to 1866
 Jørgen Moe (1813–1882) a folklorist, poet, author and Bishop of the Diocese of Kristianssand from 1874 
 Anders Castus Svarstad (1869–1943) a painter of urban landscapes

Sport 
 Gabriel Rasch (born 1976) a former road bicycle racer
 Tord Asle Gjerdalen (born 1983) a cross-country skier
 Kenneth Di Vita Jensen (born 1990) a soccer player with over 100 club caps

Twin towns — sister cities

The following cities are twinned with Hole:
  Faaborg-Midtfyn, Denmark
  Hólmavík, Iceland
  Kustavi, Finland
  Tanum, Sweden

References

External links

Municipal fact sheet from Statistics Norway

 
Municipalities of Buskerud
Municipalities of Viken (county)
Ringerike (traditional district)